Farmer's National Bank and W.H. Hughes Slate Company Office, also known as the Granville Town Hall, is a historic commercial building located at Granville, Washington County, New York.  The original section was built in 1891, and expanded twice between about 1912 and 1943. It is a two-story, five bay, cut limestone and brick building with a Romanesque style arched entrance.  It has housed Granville town offices since about 1945.

It was added to the National Register of Historic Places in 2014.

References

Commercial buildings on the National Register of Historic Places in New York (state)
Romanesque Revival architecture in New York (state)
Commercial buildings completed in 1891
Buildings and structures in Washington County, New York
National Register of Historic Places in Washington County, New York